Poura-mine is a town in the Poura Department of Balé Province in southern Burkina Faso. The town has a population of 5883.

References

Populated places in the Boucle du Mouhoun Region
Balé Province